Live at Shepherd's Bush is a 2009 live album released by Stephen Stills and recorded at Shepherds Bush Empire in London, UK in October 2008. The album featured an acoustic set and an electric set. A DVD with the same track listing was also released.

Reception 
In a positive review Allmusic said "the whole thing has a warm, engaging vibe; it's a pleasing bit of nostalgia"

Track listing

Personnel 
 Stephen Stills - guitar, vocals
 Kenny Passarelli - bass, vocals
 Joe Vitale - drums, vocals
 Todd Caldwell - keyboards, vocals
Joe Vitale Jr - Editing & Mixing

References 

2009 live albums
Stephen Stills live albums